Castanospermine is an indolizidine alkaloid first isolated from the seeds of Castanospermum australe.  It is a potent inhibitor of some glucosidase enzymes and has antiviral activity in vitro and in mouse models.

The castanospermine derivative celgosivir is an antiviral drug candidate currently in development for possible use in treating hepatitis C virus (HCV) infection.

Biosynthesis of castanospermine
L-Lys undergoes a transamination to form α-aminoadipic acid. α-aminoadipic acid undergoes a ring closure and then a reduction to form L-pipecolic acid (Figure 1). In the alternate pathway (Figure 2), L-Lys cyclizes and forms the enamine, which reduces to L-pipecolic acid.

HSCoA and then malonyl-CoA react in a Claisen reaction with L-pipecolic acid to form SCoA ester which undergoes a ring closure to form 1-indolizidinone. The carbonyl on 1-indolizidinone is reduced to the hydroxyl group. The molecule is then further hydroxylated to form the final product castanospermine.

Biosynthesis shown in figure:

See also 
 Swainsonine

References 

Alkaloids
Indolizidines
Alkaloids found in Fabaceae
Polyols
Iminosugars